Alan John Thurlow (born 18 May 1947) is an English organist. He is best known as having been Organist and Master of the Choristers of Chichester Cathedral between 1980 and 2008.

Education
Thurlow was educated at Bancroft's School, Woodford Green.  He read Music at Sheffield University before going on to Emmanuel College, Cambridge, for a period of research into pre-Reformation English Church Music.

Organist career
Thurlow joined the church choir at St Barnabas' Church, Woodford Green at the age of eight and became Master of Music at the church during his time at Bancroft's School. He held his position at St Barnabas' Church until 1973.

Durham
In 1973 he was appointed Sub-Organist at Durham Cathedral, and whilst there combined his duties at the Cathedral with those of Director of Music at the Chorister School and part-time Lecturer in Music at Durham University.

Chichester
In 1980 Thurlow succeeded Dr John Birch as Organist and Master of the Choristers of Chichester Cathedral. His first task was to oversee the rebuilding of the historic organ in the Cathedral, which had been abandoned as unplayable in 1972. Thurlow served as Administrator of the Committee which raised the funds for the Mander restoration that was completed in 1986. The Chichester organ is notable as being the only Cathedral organ in the country that escaped being romanticised in the nineteenth century. In the 1990s he served as a founder member of the Management Executive of the newly opened Pallant House Gallery, later continuing as a Trustee of the Friends of the Gallery.  He has travelled with the Cathedral Choir and the RSCM to France, the Netherlands, Germany, South Africa and the United States of America.

Thurlow retired from Chichester Cathedral in 2008. He has been credited with greatly improving the quality of music at the cathedral by expanding the choir's repertoire and building its reputation on the world stage.

Activism
Thurlow has long been a vocal opponent of mixed voice treble lines in cathedral choirs. In 1997 he offered his resignation to the Dean and Chapter of Chichester Cathedral after Salisbury Cathedral insisted that their newly founded girls choir should sing together with the boy choristers at the 1998 Southern Cathedrals Festival that was to be held in Chichester. Thurlow told a meeting of the Festival's trustees that his position would be made untenable if he were to accept this request, as he had "made such a strong case against this for so long" and "felt in (his) heart that it was wrong". Thurlow was backed by his choir, members of the Chichester congregation and the Dean of Chichester John Treadgold. Treadgold refused his resignation and a compromise was reached with Salisbury. Since 2013 he has been Vice President of Campaign for the Traditional Cathedral Choir, the controversial advocacy group that was established in 1996 as a direct response to the rise of girls' choirs in the United Kingdom.

For twelve years Thurlow was Chairman of the national charity, Friends of Cathedral Music, and for two years he served as President of the Cathedral Organists' Association.  Nationally, he has served as Chairman of the Organs Advisory Committee for the Care of Churches.  He is a Fellow of the Royal College of Organists and the Royal School of Church Music, and honorary Fellow of both The Guild of  Musicians and The Guild of Church Musicians and Singers, and in 2005 he received the award of a Lambeth Doctorate from The Archbishop of Canterbury.

Television appearance
In March 2013, Thurlow appeared in an episode of Who Do You Think You Are?, in which the comedian John Bishop traced his great-great grandfather to the city of Chichester. Thurlow showed Bishop around Chichester Cathedral Library, as they discovered that Bishop's relative had been a Lay Vicar at the cathedral.

Discography

As director:
2007 - Jubilate
2007 - Let Us Lift Up Our Heart: 19th Century Church Music
1999 - Benedicite
1999 - A Christmas Festival
1997 - Sing Ye to the Lord
1996 - Chichester Commissions
1996 - Great Cathedral Anthems Vol. 7
1994 - Malcolm Archer: Requiem
1999 - A Festival of Anthems
1991 - Magnificat and Nunc Dimittis Vol. 2
1991 - The Welkin Rings
1990 - Choral Music of Charles V. Stanford
1984 - 19th Century Church Music by Goss, Ousely, Smart, Stainer and S.S. Wesley
1984 - Cathedral Music by Geoffrey Burgon
1982 - Carols from Chichester
1981 - Peter Davey - Head Chorister of Chichester Cathedral
1981 - O Praise God in his Holiness

As organist:
1986 - The Four Pipe Organs of Chichester Cathedral
1978 - Carols from Durham Cathedral
1978 - In Quires and Places (No. 26. Durham Cathedral Choir)

References 

1946 births
Living people
Academics of the Royal College of Music
British music educators
British classical organists
British male organists
Alumni of the University of Sheffield
Organists & Masters of the Choristers of Chichester Cathedral
People educated at Bancroft's School
Cathedral organists
21st-century organists
21st-century British male musicians
Male classical organists